Jay Canfield Howell (born November 26, 1955) is a former Major League Baseball relief pitcher for the Cincinnati Reds (1980), Chicago Cubs (1981), New York Yankees (1982–1984), Oakland Athletics (1985–1987), Los Angeles Dodgers (1988–1992), Atlanta Braves (1993) and Texas Rangers (1994). He was selected in the 31st Round of the 1976 Major League Baseball Draft. He was the last player selected and signed in that draft to play in the Major Leagues. 

Howell was a member of the Los Angeles Dodgers when they won the 1988 World Series. In the third game of the National League Championship Series against the New York Mets, Howell was ejected for having pine tar, an illegal substance, in his glove, though he said the only reason he used it was to get a better grip on the ball. He was suspended for three days, but it was shortened to two days.

He was named to two American League All-Star Teams in 1985 and 1987 and the 1989 National League All-Star Team.

He currently ranks 79th on the Major League Baseball Career Saves List (155) and 83rd on the Career Games Finished List (360).

Early years
Howell attended Fairview High School and the University of Colorado.

Coaching experience
Howell coached Cal State Northridge from 1998 to 2005 where he led the Matadors to two Big Sky Conference Titles. Major League player Kameron Loe played for Howell.

References

External links

Baseball players from Miami
American League All-Stars
National League All-Stars
Los Angeles Dodgers players
Oakland Athletics players
Cincinnati Reds players
Chicago Cubs players
Colorado Buffaloes baseball players
Texas Rangers players
New York Yankees players
Atlanta Braves players
Major League Baseball pitchers
1955 births
Living people
Sportspeople from Boulder, Colorado
Eugene Emeralds players
Tampa Tarpons (1957–1987) players
Nashville Sounds players
Indianapolis Indians players
Iowa Cubs players
Columbus Clippers players
Modesto A's players
Vero Beach Dodgers players
Bakersfield Dodgers players